Al Slater may refer to:

 Al Slater (powerlifter), Canadian Paralympic powerlifter
 Alistair Slater (1956–1984), British Army soldier
 Alistair Slater (cyclist) (born 1993), British cyclist